This is a list of number-one hits in Switzerland by year from the Swiss Music Charts compiled every week.

1960s

1970s

1980s

1990s

2000s

2010s

2020s